5.10 is a Ukrainian political party, registered on 20 March 2014. The main idea of Hennadiy Balashov and his libertarian party is a radical reform of the taxation of Ukraine: full abolition of the current system and introduction of a single tax system – 5% sales tax and 10% payroll tax.

The main objective of the party is to tackle poverty and governmental control in Ukraine. Its leader Hennadiy Balashov states that he wants to turn Ukraine into a global tax haven, akin to Singapore and the Republic of Ireland.

In the 2014 Ukrainian parliamentary election the party failed to win seats, garnering 67,124 votes. The party did not participate in the 2019 Ukrainian parliamentary election.

References

External links

 Official website 

2014 establishments in Ukraine
Libertarian parties
Political parties established in 2014
Political parties in Ukraine